Bongu is a 2017 Indian Tamil-language heist film written and directed by Taj. The film stars Natarajan Subramaniam and Ruhi Singh, while Pooja Bisht plays a pivotal supporting role. Production for the film began in late 2015.

Cast 

 Natarajan Subramaniam as Saith Badshah/Thiru
 Ruhi Singh as Janani
 Manishaa Shree as Priya Reddy
 Arjunan Nandakumar as Bhaskar
 Rajan Krishnaswamy as Babu
 Sharath Lohitashwa as Pandian
 Atul Kulkarni as Subash, assistant commissioner
 Ramdoss as Mani
 Mayilsamy as Mayil
 Poster Nandakumar as Bhai
 Bava Lakshmanan as Deiva Kuzhanthai
 Chaams as a Car mechanic
 Nikita Thukral as item number "Vella Kuthira"
 Sumann as item number "Thangame"

Production 
New director Tej began working on Bongu during the middle of 2015 and stated the road movie would be shot with the backdrops of Dindigal, Madurai, Chennai, and Mumbai. The film was stated to have been based on supercars and would feature several luxury cars. Natarajan Subramaniam was announced to play the lead role in the film during October 2015, with Raai Laxmi and Pooja Bisht also revealed to be a part of the cast. Raai Laxmi suffered an injury during November 2015 and subsequently had to opt-out of the project, with Ruhi Singh replacing her in the lead role.

Soundtrack
The music composed by Srikanth Deva.

Reception 
Chennai Vision wrote, "Had only the director focused on avoiding unwanted elements and adding more pace to the proceedings, Bongu could have easily emerged yet another Sathuranga Vettai". Baradwaj Rangan of Film Companion called it "A Phenomenally Dull Caper Movie" in his review. The Hindu wrote, "The writing, for the most part, is pedestrian and the actors rarely light up a scene. Bongu is barely watchable." Indian Express wrote, "The film has tried to ride on the wave of Sathuranga Vettai's success, and to those who expect Bongu to be similar, please read the film's title once again". Times of India wrote "To sum up, Bongu is a harmless entertainer with a few engaging moments. A tightly-packed screenplay could have made it a much more interesting watch". Deccan Chronicle wrote "Bongu is entertaining, but the lack of jaw-dropping displays and careful craftsmanship makes it enjoyable only in parts".

References

External links
 

2017 films
2010s chase films
2017 crime action films
2017 crime thriller films
2017 action thriller films
Indian chase films
Films about automobiles
Indian crime action films
Indian crime thriller films
Indian action thriller films
2010s Tamil-language films
Films scored by Srikanth Deva
2017 masala films
2017 directorial debut films